Siri Lake  is situated near Shogran in Siri, on the way to Payee in Kaghan Valley, Khyber Pakhtunkhwa the province of Pakistan. It is located at the height of almost . The lake is accessible via Kiwai passing through Shogran through a jeep track.

See also 
 Shogran
 Payee Lake
 Pyala Lake
 Batakundi
 Naran

References

External links 
 Siri Lake

Lakes of Khyber Pakhtunkhwa
Mansehra District